The following is a list of Teen Choice Award winners and nominees for Choice Movie - Romance. It was formally awarded under different titles and separate categories: Choice Movie - Date Movie in 2004 and 2005, Choice Movie - Chick Flick from 2006 to 2008, Choice Movie - Bromantic Comedy in 2008 and 2009 and Choice Movie - Romantic Comedy in 2008, 2010 and 2011 before being retitled to its current title from 2009 in 2012.

Winners and nominees

2000s

2010s

References

Romance